The Omega Seamaster is a line of automatic winding mechanical diving watches from Omega with a history that can be traced back to the original water-resistant dress watch released in 1948. The Seamaster collection is perhaps best known today for the Seamaster Diver Professional 300m model that has been worn in the James Bond movie franchise since 1995. Originally conceived as a dressy, water-resistant timepiece, the Omega Seamaster has evolved to a robust sports watch line typically with a stainless steel case, robust water resistance, and an official certified chronometer certified movement within. The Diver Professional 300m is most famous for its "train track" five link steel bracelet, its helium release valve at the 10:00 position, the wave pattern dial on certain model generations, and the skeletonized handset. 

The current model range is split into separate lines of Seamaster models: the Aqua Terra line serves as the everyday sports watch model, the Diver Professional 300m line is the successor to the 1995 James Bond watch, the Planet Ocean line serves as the heavier duty dive watch line, and the Seamaster 300 (not to be confused with the Diver 300m) and Railmaster lines are modern versions of those iconic models from Omega's past. 

In 2019, three specially made experimental watches dubbed Omega Seamaster Planet Ocean Ultra Deep Professionals survived a 10,928 meter dive to the bottom of the Mariana Trench affixed to the bathyscaphe Limiting Factor, setting a new world record at the time as deepest dive watch by 12 meters.

Models 
Omega produces several models of Seamaster watches, with numerous variations of case materials, bracelet, water resistance, and case diameter. The current offerings among the Seamaster line are below:

Seamaster Aqua Terra collection: 
includes variations with date, day-date, annual calendar, GMT, world timer, and chronograph functionalities all sporting 150 meters of water resistance
Seamaster Diver Professional 300M collection: 
includes variations with date, GMT, and chronograph functionalities all sporting 300 meters of water resistance
Seamaster Planet Ocean collection: 
includes variations with date, GMT, and chronograph functionalities all sporting at least 600 meters of water resistance. The Ultra Deep variant has a 6,000m water resistance depth rating, breaking all records at the time of its release

The Seamaster line also includes the below Heritage Models:

Seamaster 300: 
Not to be confused with the above Seamaster Diver Professional 300m; a modernized take on the original diving watch from Omega first launched in 1957
Seamaster Railmaster: 
A modernized take on the original antimagnetic watch offering from Omega which also first launched in 1957 and was specially designed for those working close to magnetic fields
Seamaster Ploprof 1200m: 
From "Plongeur Professionnel," or "Professional Diver," originally launched in 1969, this is the continuation of Omega's heavy-duty tool watch for deep underwater use. This model was famously worn by Jacques Cousteau in his television series "The Undersea World of Jacques Cousteau" 
Seamaster Bullhead
A distinctive chronograph arrangement with the pushers and crown at the 12:00 position instead of at 3:00, owing its name to its resemblance to a bull's horns
Seamaster 1948: 
A tribute to the first Seamaster models of 1948 but with modern case dimensions and movement

History 

The Seamaster is the longest running product line still produced by Omega. It was introduced in 1948, and was based upon designs made for the British Royal Navy towards the end of World War II.

The original Seamaster's key feature was an O-ring gasket used to provide its waterproof seal. This design had been developed for use in submarines during the war, and turned out to also be useful for watches, where it made them much less vulnerable to temperature and pressure changes than earlier (lead or shellac) based gasket designs.

James Bond 

Omega has been associated with James Bond movies since 1995. That year, Pierce Brosnan took over the role of James Bond and wore the Omega Seamaster Professional Diver 300M Quartz (model 2541.80.00) in the movie GoldenEye. In all later films, Brosnan wore an Omega Seamaster Professional Diver 300M Chronometer (model 2531.80.00). In most of Brosnan's 007 films, the helium release valve is transformed into improbable hidden gadgets such as a laser cutter (GoldenEye and Die Another Day) or a remote detonator (Tomorrow Never Dies and Die Another Day).

Before 1995, actors portraying James Bond had usually worn the Rolex Submariner (Reference 6538). The Bond film producers wanted to update the image of the fictional "super-spy" to a more distinctly sophisticated "Euro" look. The main reason for the switch to the Omega Diver 300M for the Bond franchise is because of Lindy Hemming, a British woman, in charge of costume/wardrobe for the new movies. At the time she thought the Seamaster looked the part of a rogue special operative who also needed the ability to dress up. She recognized the history of Omega Seamasters in the British military (notably the Special Boat Service, synonymous with the character of Bond) which furthered her decision.

For the 40th anniversary of James Bond (2002), a commemorative edition of the Diver 300M chronometer was made available, model 2537.80.00 (10,007 units). The watch is identical to the model 2531.80.00 except the blue watch dial had a 007 logo inscribed across it and also machined into the case-back. The band also had 007 inscribed on the clasp.

Daniel Craig, who played Bond from Casino Royale to No Time to Die, also wears the Omega Seamaster: the Seamaster Planet Ocean and Seamaster Diver 300M in Casino Royale, and even goes so far as to mention Omega by name in the film when questioned by Vesper Lynd. In connection with the launch of the film, Omega released a 007-special of the Professional 300M, featuring the 007-gun logo on the second hand and the rifle pattern on the watch face, this being a stylized representation of the gun barrel sequence of Bond movies.

Omega released a second James Bond limited edition watch in 2006. This was a Seamaster Planet Ocean model with a limited production of 5007 units. The model is similar to what Craig wears earlier on in the film; however, it has a small orange-colored 007 logo on the second hand, an engraved case-back signifying the Bond connection, and an engraved 007 on the clasp.
In Quantum of Solace, Craig wears the Omega Seamaster Planet Ocean with a black face and steel bracelet (42 mm version). Another limited edition was released featuring the checkered "PPK grip" face with the Quantum of Solace logo over it.

The Seamaster Professional Diver 300M was worn by James Bond in six movies, the Planet Ocean and Aqua Terra in three, in addition to sporting a limited edition Omega Seamaster 300 (not to be confused with the Professional Diver 300M) Master Co-Axial in Spectre. The Seamaster Professional Diver 300M that appears from GoldenEye to Casino Royale is made of stainless steel on a stainless steel bracelet, fitted with a blue dial, unidirectional rotating bezel with blue ring and a sapphire crystal. After its absence in three films, the Diver 300M returns in No Time to Die in the form of a new model, this time with a black dial, a titanium case, powered by Omega's Co-Axial Master Chronometer 8806 and is the first in the line of Seamasters to have a Milanese mesh strap and not to feature a date window. It was designed in collaboration with Daniel Craig.

GoldenEye – 1995
Seamaster Professional Diver 300M Quartz (Reference 2541.80.00)
Tomorrow Never Dies – 1997
Seamaster Professional Diver 300M (Reference 2531.80.00)
The World Is Not Enough – 1999
Seamaster Professional Diver 300M (Reference 2531.80.00)
Die Another Day – 2002
Seamaster Professional Diver 300M (Reference 2531.80.00)
Casino Royale – 2006
Seamaster Professional Diver 300M (Reference 2220.80.00)
Seamaster Professional Planet Ocean (Reference 2900.50.91) 
Quantum of Solace – 2008
Seamaster Professional Planet Ocean (Reference 2201.50.00)
Skyfall – 2012
Seamaster Professional Planet Ocean (Reference 232.30.42.21.01.001)
Seamaster Aqua Terra (Reference 231.10.39.21.03.001)
Spectre – 2015
Seamaster 300 "SPECTRE" Limited Edition (Reference 233.32.41.21.01.001)
Seamaster Aqua Terra (Reference 231.10.42.21.03.004)
No Time to Die – 2021
Seamaster Professional Diver 300M (Reference 210.90.42.20.01.001)
Seamaster Aqua Terra (Reference 231.10.42.21.03.004)

Co-Axial movement 

The term Co-Axial represents a specialized watch escapement exclusive to Omega that was developed in 1970 by British horologist and watchmaker George Daniels. The Swiss Lever escapement has been the standard in horology for hundreds of years. The escapement provides the release of energy from the mainspring to the going train that further controls the function of the moving parts that measure time and other complications. The Swiss lever, although the mainstay in the industry, has the capability to be strong on energy conservation but needs considerable lubrication between the impulse pallet and the escape wheel teeth due to sliding friction. This causes considerable wear on the lubrication over time and may cause wear on the pallet or escape wheel. Because of this, regular service (4–5 years) is recommended to clean, lubricate, and possibly replace parts. With the co-axial escapement, the impulse is done with a push to the jewels rather than a sliding fashion. In this design the work is divided between two major wheels of the escapement. Daniels brought his desire to industrialize his escapement to many Swiss manufacturers and he was ultimately denied. Omega in 1999 took on Daniels design with the insight of Nicolas Hayek who saw Omega as a brand of innovation and creativity who would rise to the top of the Swiss horological spectrum with the production of the co-axial escapement. He was right and Omega is one of the largest Swiss manufacturers and the second largest producer of COSC Officially Certified Chronometers, next to Rolex with Breitling being third, with every one of their movements COSC chronometers. The first co-axial movement to be brought to the public was the Omega cal. 2500, with different variations being listed as A, B, C, and D. This movement was built from the Omega "in-family" cal. 1120 (finished chronometer grade ETA 2892-A with two extra jewels) A, B, and C are similar two tier co-axial movements, but C is the first version to solve certain problems prevalent in A and B. For example, the vibrations per hour were originally 28,800 (standard for most Swiss watches with Swiss Lever Escapements) but later lowered to 25,200 (7 vs 8 v beats a second). This change was noted that it was the optimal working vibration of the movement and may contribute to lower service intervals. The Co-axial D variation was made to allow for an even more efficient 3 tier escapement. This development of technology helped the company innovate the 8400 (no date)/8500(w/date complication)/9300 (chronograph) three tier in-house movements. The co-axial D variation is still made specifically for the Omega Diver 300m co-axial. The Diver 300m, a watch produced since 1993 has a certain shape and size that is characteristic of this watch, the 2500 is slender enough to keep the case shape and size proportionate on the Diver 300m (also known as the SMP).

Master Co-Axial/ Master Chronometer

The next generation of watchmaking focuses on anti-magnetic movements. According to studies by the COSC, the majority of watches in for service from 4+ years are primarily suffering accuracy issues due to magnetized movements. Many Swiss watch institutions have made additional efforts to alleviate the problem of magnetization. Some of the technology and practices include iron cages around the movement, silicon hairspring (Omega) (spring in the balance wheel of the escapement), Parachrom hairspring (Rolex), induction of plastic parts, and using non-magnetic metals. Only until recently has any watchmaker made a fully anti-magnetic movement. The first watch able to resist magnetic fields up to 15,000 gauss was the Omega Aqua Terra Gauss. The first full anti-magnetic movement and Master Chronometer certified by the COSC is the Omega Constellation "Pie-Pan" Globemaster. This movement is capable of having a see-through case-back (the cal. 8800 in the new Seamaster 300 M) characterized by a movement with fully anti-magnetic parts. This is the beginning of a new generation of watch movements, re-institutionalizing the mechanical movement that once was deemed obsolete by the quartz movement of the 1970s to the present day.
In 2018, the 70th anniversary of the Seamaster, and the 25th anniversary of the Seamaster Diver 300 M, Omega released a new version of the Diver 300 M (also known as Seamaster Professional). It features a zirconium dioxide bezel as well as a zirconium dioxide watch face with laser engraved waves, paying tribute to the very first Seamaster Professional models. The watch is continued to be loved by collectors and enthusiasts as a "modern classic" with an outermost "go anywhere" attitude and elegance of a dress watch.

Notable wearers
 Joe Biden, 46th President of the United States of America
 William, Prince of Wales, wears a 36mm Seamaster Diver Professional 300m quartz gifted to him by his late mother, Diana, Princess of Wales
 Daniel Craig, actor who portrayed James Bond from 2006 to 2021
 Jon Hamm, actor
 Michael Phelps, American swimmer and Olympic champion
 Gordon Ramsay, Scottish celebrity chef

References

External links

Omega watches
Products introduced in 1948